Chase Roullier (born August 23, 1993) is an American football center for the Washington Commanders of the National Football League (NFL). He played college football at Wyoming and was drafted by Washington, then known as the Redskins, in the sixth round of the 2017 NFL Draft.

Professional career

Roullier was drafted by the Washington Redskins in the sixth round (199th overall) in the 2017 NFL Draft. He played in 13 games as a rookie, starting seven at center while missing three due to a hand injury. Roullier started every game at center in 2018. Roullier started 14 games in 2019, missing two due to injury.

On January 2, 2021, Roullier signed a four-year contract extension worth $40.5 million.
In the Week 8 game against the Denver Broncos, he was carted off the field after fracturing his fibula in the second quarter and was placed on injured reserve on November 2, 2021. 

Roullier was on the active/physically unable to perform for the first day of training camp in 2022 before being activated the following day. He suffered a MCL tear in his right knee in Week 2 and was placed on injured reserve.

References

External links
 Washington Commanders bio
 Wyoming Cowboys bio

1993 births
Living people
American football centers
People from Burnsville, Minnesota
Players of American football from Minnesota
Sportspeople from the Minneapolis–Saint Paul metropolitan area
Washington Commanders players
Washington Football Team players
Washington Redskins players
Wyoming Cowboys football players